The 1980 ECAC North men's basketball tournament was hosted by the higher seeds in head-to-head matchups. It was the inaugural tournament ever held for the ECAC North. The final was held at The Hart Center on the campus at the College of Holy Cross. Holy Cross gained their first and only America East Conference Championship in the first ever tournament as well as an automatic berth to the NCAA tournament with its win over Boston University. Holy Cross was given the 11th seed in the East Regional of the NCAA Tournament and lost in the first round to Maryland 84–78. Boston University gained a bid to the NIT and lost in the first round to Boston College 95–74.

Bracket and Results

See also
America East Conference
1980 ECAC South men's basketball tournament

References

America East Conference men's basketball tournament
1979–80 ECAC North men's basketball season
Holy Cross Crusaders men's basketball